Buenna Hill, located off Ferguson Rd. near Centerville, Kentucky, was listed on the National Register of Historic Places in 1983. It has also been known as Cythiana Hall.  The listing included four contributing buildings.

It is described as a "Handsome Greek Revival house built by John McMurtry, well-known architect-builder for Robert Innes of the prominent Innes family who owned a large amount of property on the Russell Cave Pike."

References

National Register of Historic Places in Fayette County, Kentucky
Greek Revival houses in Kentucky
Houses in Fayette County, Kentucky
Houses on the National Register of Historic Places in Kentucky